The 2009 Lusophony Games was the 2nd Lusophony Games, a multi-sport event for delegations representing Portuguese-speaking National Olympic committees.
It took place in Lisbon, Portugal, from 11 to 19 July 2009. The Pavilhão Atlântico acted as the main venue, staging the opening ceremonies and the majority of the sporting events.

Host decision
The organization was awarded to Portugal during the 6th ACOLOP general assembly, gathered in Macau, on 10 October 2006. José Vicente de Moura, president of the Olympic Committee of Portugal and honorary president of the ACOLOP, is also the president of the Organizing Committee for the 2009 Lusophony Games (COJOL).

Participants

Portugal (170 athletes)
Macau
Brazil
Cape Verde
Mozambique
Angola
Equatorial Guinea
India
Sri Lanka (20 athletes)
Guinea-Bissau
East Timor
São Tomé and Príncipe

Games

Sports
On 21 May 2007, during a meeting between the 2009 Games Organizing Committee (COJOL) and the ACOLOP (Associação dos Comités de Língua Oficial Portuguesa), a decision on which should be the ninth sport to be included in the competition program—out of a list that included badminton, canoeing, judo, swimming, and roller hockey — was delayed due to insufficient survey data from some of the ACOLOP member committees. Later that year, on 12 November the ACOLOP general assembly, gathered in Lisbon, finally decided to add judo to the official program.

This edition thus featured nine sports—one more than in the inaugural games in 2006 — comprising 65 events. Three events for disabled athletes were included in the athletics competition, for a total of 68. One of those disabled athletics events is of demonstration nature and is not included in the medal ranking.

Athletics
Disabled athletics
Basketball
Beach volleyball
Football (men)

Futsal (men)
Judo
Table Tennis
Taekwondo
Volleyball

Venues
Most of the competitions were held in venues within Lisbon, but other sports, like beach and indoor volleyball, were played in the neighbouring municipalities of Oeiras and Almada, respectively. The opening and closing ceremonies were held at Pavilhão Atlântico, the largest venue, where four sports took place as well.

Calendar
In this table, each blue box represents an event competition, such as a qualification round or group match. The golden boxes represent days during which medal-awarding finals for a sport were held. The number indicated in each box represents the number of finals that were to be contested on that day. The sports marked with an asterisk (*) means that it has an event that is a demonstration sport and its champion does not count in the final tally.

Symbols
The image and identity of the Lisbon 2009 Lusophony Games were conveyed by its official logo and mascot.
The logo represents an "athlete, celebrating victory with a multicoloured ribbon, following the motto 'Union stronger than Victory', in an appeal to fair-play and unity between the athletes".
The mascot, representing a youthful humanized flame, is called "Xama" (after "chama", "flame" in English) and embodies the spirit of sport, the athlete's desire to surpass own limits, the "energy and vivacity" that give "body and soul in every heat".

Medal table
Note that when each champion is counted, the results will differ from the official results, therefore the following table will not match the official one as shown on the competition's website.

References

External links
Official website (archived)

 
2009 in multi-sport events
Lusophony
2009
International sports competitions hosted by Portugal
Multi-sport events in Portugal
2000s in Lisbon
Sports competitions in Lisbon
July 2009 sports events in Europe